
Gmina Lubowidz is an urban-rural gmina (administrative district) in Żuromin County, Masovian Voivodeship, in east-central Poland.

The gmina contains part of the protected area called Górzno-Lidzbark Landscape Park.

Villages
Gmina Lubowidz contains the villages and settlements of Bądzyn, Biały Dwór, Cieszki, Dziwy, Galumin, Goliaty, Huta, Jasiony, Kaleje, Kipichy, Konopaty, Kozilas, Łazy, Lisiny, Lubowidz, Majdany-Leśniczówka, Mały Las, Mleczówka, Obórki, Osówka, Pątki, Pątki-Ośniak, Pątki-Pieńki, Płociczno, Przerodki, Przerodki-Kosmal, Purzyce, Ruda, Ruda Kurzyska, Rynowo, Sinogóra, Sinogóra-Psota, Sinogóra-Rozwozinek, Straszewy, Suchy Grunt, Syberia, Syberia-Wapniska, Sztok, Toruniak, Wronka, Wylazłowo, Żarnówka, Zatorowizna, Zatorowizna-Kresy, Zdrojki-Chojnowo, Zdrojki-Piegowo, Żelaźnia and Zieluń.

Neighbouring gminas
Gmina Lubowidz is bordered by the gminas of Górzno, Kuczbork-Osada, Lidzbark, Lutocin, Skrwilno, Świedziebnia and Żuromin.

References
Polish official population figures 2006

Lubowidz
Żuromin County